The cheroot is a filterless cylindrical cigar with both ends clipped during manufacture. Since cheroots do not taper, they are inexpensive to roll mechanically, and their low cost makes them popular.

The word 'cheroot' probably comes via Portuguese charuto, originally from Tamil curuttu/churuttu/shuruttu (சுருட்டு), "roll of tobacco". This word could have been absorbed into the French language from Tamil during the 18th century, when the French were trying to stamp their presence in South India. The word could have then been absorbed into English from French. Cheroots originated in Tamil Nadu in India. Cheroot are longer than another filterless Indian-origin product, the beedi.

Asia

Cheroots are traditional in Burma and India, and consequently were popular among the British during the days of the British Empire. They are often associated with Burma in literature:

Apparently, cheroot smoking was also associated with resistance against tropical disease in India. Verrier Elwin wrote in a foreword (1957) to Leaves from the Jungle: Life in a Gond Village:

Although a cheroot is defined as cylindrical, home-rolled cheroots in Burma are sometimes conical.

See also
 Beedi
 Cigar

References

External links

A whackin' white cheroot
Making cheroots

Cigars